The  Manikyala Stupa is a Buddhist stupa near the village of Tope Mankiala, in Pakistan's Punjab province. The stupa was built to commemorate the spot, where according to the Jataka tales, an incarnation of the Buddha called Prince Sattva sacrificed himself to feed seven hungry tiger cubs.

Location
Mankiala stupa is located in the village of Tope Mankiala, near the place named Sagri and 2nd near the village of Sahib Dhamyal. It is 36 km southeast of Islamabad, and near the city of Rawalpindi. It is visible from the nearby historic Rawat Fort.

Significance

The stupa was built to commemorate the spot, where according to the Jataka tales, the Golden Light Sutra and popular belief, Prince Sattva, an earlier incarnation of the Buddha, sacrificed some of his body parts to feed seven hungry tiger cubs.

History
The stupa is said to have been built during the reign of Kanishka between 128 and 151 CE. An alternate theory suggest that the stupa is one of 84 such buildings, built during the reign of Mauryan emperor Ashoka to house the ashes of the Buddha. It is said that Emperor Kanishka used to visit this stupa often to pay respects to Buddha during his campaigns.

The stupa was discovered by Mountstuart Elphinstone, the first British emissary to Afghanistan, in 1808 - a detailed account of which is in his memoir 'Kingdom of Caubul' (1815). The stupa contains an engraving which indicates that the stupa was restored in 1891.

Relics
Mankiala stupa's relic deposits were discovered by Jean-Baptiste Ventura in 1830. The relics were then removed from the site during the British Raj, and are now housed in the British Museum.

Inscription
On one of the stones of the stupa there is an inscription which reads as:

Conservation
The stupa has not been restored since 1891, and remains largely abandoned. The stupa features a large defect in its mound, which was created by plunderers.

Access 
Mankiala's stupa is located near the Mankiala Road in the village of Tope Mankiala. Towards the west, the Mankiala Road intersects the N-5 National Highway, which provides access to Islamabad and Rawalpindi. The site can also be accessed by the Mankiala railway station in the nearby village of Mankiala, which is served by the Karachi–Peshawar Railway Line.

Gallery

See also
Takht Bahi
Gandhara
Taxila
Dharmarajika Stupa - largest of the stupas which form the Ruins of Taxila.

References

Stupas in Pakistan
Buddhist sites in Pakistan
Archaeological sites in Punjab, Pakistan